Battery E, 2nd Missouri Light Artillery Regiment was an artillery battery that served in the Union Army during the American Civil War and Plains Indian Wars.

Service
Organized at St Louis, Mo., January, 1862. Attached to District of St. Louis to September, 1863. Reorganized September 29, 1863, from Batteries "E," "L," "M." District of St. Louis, Mo., to December, 1863. Artillery, 1st Cavalry Division, Army Arkansas, and 7th Army Corps, Dept. of Arkansas, to April, 1864. Artillery, 3rd Division, 7th Army Corps, to May, 1864. Artillery, 1st Division, 7th Army Corps, to June. 1865. District of the Plains, Dept. Missouri, to November, 1865.

Detailed service
Duty in District of St. Louis, Mo., till December, 1863. Actions at Bloomfield, Mo., September 11 and October 22, 1862. Cape Girardeau April 26, 1863. Ordered to Little Rock, Ark. December, 1863, and duty there till March, 1864. Steele's Expedition to Camden April 23-May 3. Elkin's Ferry, Little Missouri River, April 3–4, 1864. Prairie D'Ann April 9–12. Camden April 15–18. Marks' Mills April 25. Duty at Little Rock till June, 1865. Ordered to St Louis, Mo., and equipped as Cavalry. Moved to Omaha, Neb. Powder River Expedition, march to Powder River and  Fort Connor July 1-September 20. Actions on Powder River September 2–8. Mustered out November 22, 1865.

Commanders
 Captain Jefferson Miller

See also

 2nd Missouri Light Artillery Regiment
 Missouri Civil War Union units
 Missouri in the Civil War

References
 Dyer, Frederick H.  A Compendium of the War of the Rebellion (Des Moines, IA:  Dyer Pub. Co.), 1908.
Attribution
 

Military units and formations established in 1862
Military units and formations disestablished in 1865
Units and formations of the Union Army from Missouri
1862 establishments in Missouri
Artillery units and formations of the American Civil War